Brasil '86 is an album by Sérgio Mendes. The album is best known for four songs by different vocalists: "Daylight" sung by Siedah Garrett, "Your Smile" by Gracinha Leporace, "No Place to Hide" by Lani Hall, and "What Do We Mean to Each Other", a duet by Lisa Bevill and Joe Pizzulo, which charted at No. 19 on the Billboard Adult Contemporary chart in 1987 (No. 16 on the Radio & Records AC chart).  The first single released in 1986, "Take This Love" (which is sung by Pizzulo and features Michael McDonald on backing vocals) charted at No. 14 on Billboards AC chart and charted at No. 9 on the R&R AC chart.

Track list
 "Daylight" (Diane Warren, Peter Wolf, Sergio Mendes) - arranged by Peter Wolf, Sergio Mendes, vocals by Gracinha Leporace, Siedah Garrett – 4:30
 "Take This Love" (John Parker, Peter Beckett) - arranged by Peter Wolf, vocals by Joe Pizzulo, backing vocals by Joe Pizzulo, Julia Waters, Maxine Waters Willard, Michael McDonald, Phil Perry, Phillip Ingram, Siedah Garrett – 4:20
 "What Do We Mean to Each Other" (Peter Wolf, Ina Wolf) - arranged by Peter Wolf, vocals by Joe Pizzulo, Lisa Bevill, backing vocals by Joe Pizzulo, Lisa Bevill, Phil Perry, Michael McDonald, Robin Beck, Siedah Garrett – 4:35
 "Your Smile" (Dori Caymmi, Paulo César Pinheiro) (Ina Wolf – English lyrics) - arranged by Dori Caymmi, Peter Wolf, Sergio Mendes, vocals by Gracinha Leporace, backing vocals by Joe Pizzulo, Kate Markowitz, Siedah Garrett – 3:30
 "The River" ("O Rio") (Dori Caymmi) (Fernando Pessoa – poem lyrics) - arranged by: Dori Caymmi, Peter Wolf, Sergio Mendes, vocals by Dori Caymmi – 2:35
 "Nonstop" (Bob Marlette, Sue Shifrin) - arranged by: Peter Wolf, vocals by Gracinha Leporace, Maxine Waters Willard, Siedah Garrett – 3:23
 "It Hurts a Whole Lot More" (Tom Snow) - arranged by Peter Wolf, vocals by Joe Pizzulo, backing vocals by Joe Pizzulo, Lisa Bevill, Michael McDonald, Robin Beck, Siedah Garrett – 4:13
 "Flower of Bahia" ("Flor Da Bahia") (Dori Caymmi, Paulo César Pinheiro) - arranged by Dori Caymmi, Peter Wolf, Sergio Mendes, vocals by Gracinha Leporace, backing vocals by Joe Pizzulo – 4:19
 "No Place to Hide" (Dori Caymmi, Paulo César Pinheiro) - arranged by Dori Caymmi, Peter Wolf, Sergio Mendes, vocals by Lani Hall – 2:49
 "Here Where I Belong" (Tom Snow) - arranged by Peter Wolf, Sergio Mendes, vocals by Joe Pizzulo – 4:13

 Personnel Musicians Sérgio Mendes – keyboards (1-5, 7-10), Synclavier (1-5, 7-10), acoustic piano (10)
 Peter Wolf – keyboards, Synclavier, Synclavier bass (3, 5, 6, 7), Synclavier drums (3, 6, 7), effects (10)
 Dann Huff – guitars (1-4, 6-9)
 Dori Caymmi – acoustic guitar (3, 4, 5, 8, 9)
 Nathan East – bass (2, 8, 9)
 Alphonso Johnson – bass (4)
 Jeff Porcaro – drums (1, 2, 8, 9), percussion (5)
 Paulinho da Costa – percussion (1, 2, 3, 6, 8)
 Ernie Watts – saxophone solo (2, 3)Production'
 Sérgio Mendes – producer 
 Peter Wolf – producer 
 Paul Erickson – engineer 
 Brian Malouf – engineer, mixing at Can-Am Recorders (Tarzana, California)
 Thom Perry – engineer 
 Bruce Swedien – engineer 
 David Bowman – assistant engineer 
 Michael Bowman – assistant engineer
 Dan Garcia – assistant engineer 
 Bernie Grundman – mastering at Bernie Grundman Mastering (Hollywood, California)
 Chuck Beeson – art direction, design 
 Tom Nordstrom – painting

References

1986 albums
Sérgio Mendes albums
A&M Records albums
Albums arranged by Sérgio Mendes